CCDC116, also called coiled-coil domain containing 116, is a gene that is patented for experimentation on the possibility of being a cancer marker for prostate cancer.

Gene 
CCDC116 has no aliases. This gene is 2252 base pairs long. CCDC116 has 5 exons and is located on chromosome 22q11.21 on the plus strand.

mRNA 
CCDC116 has two isoforms. The isoforms differ in the 3’ UTR and coding sequence.

Protein
CCDC116 is 612 amino acids long.  CCDC116 is 67.9 kdal. This protein has an isoelectric point of 9.24. This protein is a part of the domain of unknown function 4702.

It is predicted that CCDC116 is located in the nucleus.  It is predicted that the membrane typology of this protein is a type 3a rolled up beta sheet. This protein has mostly alpha helices with a few coils.

Expression 
CCDC116 is primarily found in the testis, although this gene is found in very small amounts in the brain and connective tissue. There are two SNPs that are upstream variants, one that is a downstream variant, one that is an intron variant.

Regulation of Expression 
CCDC116 has four promoter regions and eight primary transcripts. Two promoter regions located on the + strand, and two located on the - strand.

Function Protein Partners 
CCDC116 has two predicted function partners.  NGFRAP is a nerve growth factor receptor associated protein.  This gene is believed to play a role in the pathogenesis of neurogenetic diseases, although that claim has not been proven.

Clinical Significance 
There has yet to be any disease association with CCDC116, but currently there is a patent for this gene with the potential for it to be related to cancer. A study was done in 2012 on observing how this gene is expressed in human pancreatic islets and in endocrine pancreatic tumors.

References 

Genes